Paul Frase (born May 5, 1965) is a former American football player who played professionally in the National Football League for 11 seasons, from 1988 to 1998. He grew up in Barrington, New Hampshire and studied psychology at Syracuse University. Frase played with the New York Jets (1988–1994, where his teammates honored him with the Ed Block Courage Award), the Jacksonville Jaguars (1995–1996), Green Bay Packers (1997), and the Baltimore Ravens (1998).

During the 1995 season, Frase received the Ed Block Courage Award for an unprecedented second time in the award's 18-year history.  He was selected by the Jacksonville Jaguars in the 1995 NFL Expansion Draft.

Paul Frase and his wife Alison Rockett-Frase founded and continue to run a charity called "The Joshua Frase Foundation", named after their son Joshua. The foundation raises funds for medical research of myotubular myopathy, and other related congenital myopathies. Frase now lives Jacksonville, Florida.

References

External links
The Joshua Frase Foundation the United States charity founded by Paul Frase and his wife, supporting medical research for myotubular myopathy and other related congenital myopathies.
Paul Frase football stats on databaseFootball.com

1965 births
Living people
Sportspeople from Elmira, New York
American football defensive tackles
American football defensive ends
Syracuse Orange football players
New York Jets players
Jacksonville Jaguars players
Green Bay Packers players
Baltimore Ravens players
People from Barrington, New Hampshire
Players of American football from Jacksonville, Florida
Sportspeople from Strafford County, New Hampshire
Ed Block Courage Award recipients